Hirokazu is a masculine Japanese given name.

Possible writings
Hirokazu can be written using different kanji characters and can mean:
, "vast, harmony"
, "command, one"
, "wide, harmony"
, "abundant, harmony"
, "wide, one"
, "vast, many"
, "ocean, one"
, "command, harmony"
, "tolerant, harmony"
, "broad, harmony"
The name can also be written in hiragana or katakana.

People with the name
, Japanese former football player
, Japanese footballer
, Japanese character designer and animation director for Sunrise
, Japanese professional baseball player in Japan's Nippon Professional Baseball
, world-renowned Japanese master of Shotokan karate
, Japanese aikido teacher, student of the founder of aikido Morihei Ueshiba
, Japanese figure skater
, Japanese film director, producer, screenwriter and editor
, Japanese politician of the Liberal Democratic Party
, Japanese bureaucrat, a business leader, and a politician
, Japanese football player and manager
, Japanese former football player
, Japanese football player
, Japanese former football player
, Japanese politician of the Democratic Party of Japan
, Japanese composer and musician who has written music for video games produced by Nintendo
, Japanese shogi player
, Paralympian athlete from Japan competing mainly in category T52 long distance events
, Japanese football player
, Japanese former ski jumper who competed between 1979 and 1984
, Japanese video game designer and Sonic Team's 2nd Assistant President

Japanese masculine given names